Turner Museum may refer to

 Turner Museum of Glass, housed in the Department of Engineering Materials at the University of Sheffield, England, founded by W.E.S. Turner
 Fred Turner Folk and Culture Museum, in Loeriesfontein, South Africa
 Turner Contemporary, a gallery and visual arts organization in Margate, Kent, England, celebrating J.M.W. Turner's association with that town
 Turner Curling Museum, in Weyburn, Saskatchewan, Canada
 Janet Turner Print Museum, at California State University, Chico
 Turner Museum & Historical Association, in Turner, Maine, USA, housed in the original Leavitt Area High School
 Enoch Turner School, a schoolhouse museum in Toronto, Canada

See also
 Turner House (disambiguation)
 Turner Gallery (disambiguation)